{{DISPLAYTITLE:C22H32O4}}
The molecular formula C22H32O4 may refer to:

 Iloprost, a drug used to treat blood vessels constriction
 Maresin, a macrophage-derived mediator of inflammation
 Protectin D1, a specialized proresolving mediator
 Resocortol, a synthetic glucocorticoid corticosteroid